Margaret Ann Hartley  (born 1942) is a former New Zealand member of parliament, a former mayor of North Shore City, and a member of the Labour Party.

Early years
Hartley was born in 1942 in the town of Warkworth. Before entering politics, she was a real estate agent. From 1980 to 1986 she was a member of the Birkenhead City Council, a member of the Child Abuse Prevention Society from 1983 to 1986 and a member of the Auckland Education Board 1984 to 1989.

Political career

Mayoralties
From 1986, Hartley was the mayor of Birkenhead City, which in 1989 was absorbed into the newly created North Shore City. She then became mayor of North Shore City.

In 1990, Hartley was awarded the New Zealand 1990 Commemoration Medal.

Member of Parliament

As she was ranked 47th on Labour's party list in this first MMP election, she did not enter Parliament as a list MP either.

She remained in Parliament as a list candidate.

Hartley served as the Deputy Speaker of the House in the 47th New Zealand Parliament and the Assistant Speaker from the 2005 general election until her retirement from national politics in February 2008. She was replaced by former environment minister Marian Hobbs as Assistant Speaker and by Louisa Wall as Labour list MP.

Later activities

In the 2007 local body elections Hartley was elected to the North Shore City Council, and left Parliament in 2008 after the summer recess.

At the 2010 local government elections, when the North Shore City Council (along with all the other councils in the Auckland region) was amalgamated into the single Auckland Council, she stood for the North Shore Ward under the Shore Voice ticket and was successful. She started her new role when the council came into existence on 1 November 2010. Hartley was not re-elected at the 2013 Auckland Council election where she placed third running for re-election to one of the two seats in the North Shore Ward.

Hartley was elected to the Kaipātiki Local Board at the 2016 Auckland elections.

In the 2022 New Year Honours, Hartley was appointed a Companion of the Queen's Service Order, for services to local government and the community.

Notes

References

External links
 

1942 births
Living people
New Zealand Labour Party MPs
Mayors of North Shore City
Women mayors of places in New Zealand
New Zealand list MPs
Auckland Councillors
North Shore City Councillors
Mayors of places in the Auckland Region
Unsuccessful candidates in the 1996 New Zealand general election
Unsuccessful candidates in the 1993 New Zealand general election
New Zealand MPs for Auckland electorates
Members of the New Zealand House of Representatives
New Zealand real estate agents
People from Warkworth, New Zealand
Date of birth missing (living people)
21st-century New Zealand politicians
21st-century New Zealand women politicians
Women members of the New Zealand House of Representatives
Companions of the Queen's Service Order